Market development is a growth strategy that identifies and develops new market segments for current products. A development strategy targets non-buying customers in currently targeted segments. It also targets new customers in new segments. A market development strategy entails expanding the potential market through new users or new uses. New users can be defined as new geographic segments, new demographic segments, new institutional segments or new psychographic segments. Another way is to expand sales through new uses for the product.

For discontinuous innovations, which are those that impose a change of behavior, new learning, or a new process on the buyer or end user, a focused market development strategy is needed to bridge the gap between the early market and the mainstream.

A marketing manager has to think about the following questions before implementing a market development strategy: Is it profitable? Will it require the introduction of new or modified products? Is the customer and channel well enough researched and understood?

See also 
Market penetration
Product development
Product diversification

Marketing strategy